Empire Gull was the name of several ships, including:

, a steamship built in 1919 for the United States Shipping Board
, a Landing Ship, Tank built in 1945 for the Royal Navy

Ship names